Tarabai (1675-1761), was the regent of the Maratha Empire of India.

Tarabai may also refer to:

 Tarabai, São Paulo, municipality in São Paulo, Brazil
 Tarabai Shinde (1850-1910), Indian feminist activist
 Tarabai Modak (1892-1973), Indian social worker
 Tarabai Vartak (1926-2008), Indian politician
 Tarabai (footballer) (born 1985), Edison Luiz dos Santos, Brazilian footballer